Teplogorye is a rural locality (a village) and the administrative center of Teplogorskoye Rural Settlement, Velikoustyugsky District, Vologda Oblast, Russia. The population was 392 as of 2002. There are 5 streets.

Geography 
Teplogorye is located 67 km southeast of Veliky Ustyug (the district's administrative centre) by road. Berezovka is the nearest rural locality.

References 

Rural localities in Velikoustyugsky District